Henri Rollan (23 March 1888 – 23 June 1967) was a French film actor. He appeared in more than 40 films between 1910 and 1962.

Selected filmography

 De afwezige (1913)
 Les Trois Mousquetaires (1921)
 The Three Masks (1921)
 Paris Qui Dort (1925)
 Alone (1931)
 Moonlight (1932)
 The Three Musketeers (1932)
 The Ironmaster (1933)
 Miquette (1934)
 The Scandal (1934)
 L'Aventurier (1934)
 The Mysteries of Paris (1935)
 La Garçonne (1936)
 The Phantom Gondola (1936)
 Giuseppe Verdi (1938)
 Les joueurs (1951)
 Bluebeard (1951)
 The Case of Doctor Galloy (1951)
 Fanfan la Tulipe (1952)
 The Lovers of Marianne (1953)
 The Adventures of Arsène Lupin (1957)

References

External links

1888 births
1967 deaths
French male film actors
French male silent film actors
Male actors from Paris
Sociétaires of the Comédie-Française
20th-century French male actors